Cliffs of the Neuse State Park is a North Carolina state park in Seven Springs, Wayne County, North Carolina in the United States. It is located near Seven Springs, North Carolina and covers  along the southern banks of the Neuse River. It has a swimming area, camp sites, hiking trails, fishing areas, and picnic areas. The park's museum features exhibits about the geology and natural history of the cliffs and the park. Layers of sand, clay, seashells, shale and gravel form the multicolored cliff face, a rainbow of white, tan, yellow and brown.

History

The cliffs were formed when a fault in the Earth's crust shifted millions of years ago. The Neuse River followed this fault line and, over time, cut its course through layers of sediment deposited by shallow seas that had earlier covered the coastal plain. A portion of the river took a bend against its bank and the water's erosive action slowly carved Cliffs of the Neuse.

Much of the human history of the area centers around the river. The Tuscarora and Saponi Indian tribes once occupied much of the land between the Neuse and Pamlico rivers. What is now the park used to be a ceremonial ground and a gathering place for hunting expeditions. The river was also used for travel into the surrounding wilderness.

In 1944, local landowner Lionel Weil, a founder of Goldsboro's historic Oheb Shalom synagogue and uncle of Gertrude Weil, proposed that the cliffs area along the Neuse River be preserved as a state park. The park was established in 1945 when land on the south side of the river was donated by Lionel Weil and other individuals through the Wayne Foundation. An additional contribution of approximately  extended the boundary east of the river.

Wildlife 

A range of habitats contributes to the variety of plants in the park. River margins, flood plains, rolling uplands and ravines are home to a large mixture of trees, shrubs and herbaceous plants. More than 420 species of plants have been recorded in the park.

Opossums, raccoons, foxes, and squirrels are common in the campground and along hiking trails, while river otter and muskrat can be seen swimming along the waterways. Reptiles and amphibians are equally at home in the wetland and aquatic habitats. Most of the snakes are nonvenomous, although copperheads are present. Small nocturnal rodents and white-tailed deer live in the area but are discreet and seldom seen. Sightings of black bears and a coyote have taken place at the park.

Birds are abundant in the park during any season. The northern parula nests in clumps of Spanish moss while the prothonotary warbler lives along the river. Fall and winter bring a host of migratory waterfowl to the area to join the native wood duck.

References

External links
 

State parks of North Carolina
Protected areas of Wayne County, North Carolina
Museums in Wayne County, North Carolina
Natural history museums in North Carolina
Protected areas established in 1945